Mattia Zuin (born 8 March 1996) is an Italian swimmer.

He competed in the 4×200 m freestyle relay event at the 2018 European Aquatics Championships, winning the bronze medal.

References

1996 births
Living people
Italian male freestyle swimmers
European Aquatics Championships medalists in swimming
Mediterranean Games gold medalists for Italy
Mediterranean Games medalists in swimming
Swimmers at the 2018 Mediterranean Games
Universiade medalists in swimming
Swimmers at the 2022 Mediterranean Games
Universiade silver medalists for Italy
Medalists at the 2019 Summer Universiade